F-box only protein 28 is a protein that in humans is encoded by the FBXO28 gene.

Members of the F-box protein family, such as FBXO28, are characterized by an approximately 40-amino acid F-box motif. SCF complexes, formed by SKP1 (MIM 601434), cullin (see CUL1; MIM 603134), and F-box proteins, act as protein-ubiquitin ligases. F-box proteins interact with SKP1 through the F box, and they interact with ubiquitination targets through other protein interaction domains (Jin et al., 2004).[supplied by OMIM]

References

Further reading